Kimberly Williams (born 3 November 1988) is a Jamaican triple jumper. She is a multiple time Jamaican National Champion.  She was successful as a youth athlete, winning the 2003 CARIFTA Games (under 17 division) as a 14 year old.  She was runner up at the 2007 Pan American Junior Athletics Championships.  Later, she jumped for Florida State University and was a four time NCAA Champion.  By the time she graduated in 2012, she was "the most decorated women's track and field athlete in Florida State history."  Since then she is the reigning Commonwealth Games champion.  She was a finalist in the 2016 Olympics, ranking as high as 4th after two rounds of jumping, ultimately finishing seventh.

She has qualified to represent Jamaica at the 2020 Summer Olympics.

International competitions

Personal bests
Outdoor
Long jump – 6.42 (+1.1 m/s, Tallahassee 2009)
Triple jump – 14.69 (+1.6 m/s, Doha 2021)
Indoor
Long jump – 6.55 (Blacksburg 2011)
Triple jump – 14.62 (Belgrad 2022)

References

External links

1988 births
Living people
Jamaican female triple jumpers
People from Saint Thomas Parish, Jamaica
Athletes (track and field) at the 2012 Summer Olympics
Athletes (track and field) at the 2016 Summer Olympics
Olympic athletes of Jamaica
Athletes (track and field) at the 2014 Commonwealth Games
World Athletics Championships athletes for Jamaica
Commonwealth Games medallists in athletics
Commonwealth Games gold medallists for Jamaica
Central American and Caribbean Games gold medalists for Jamaica
Competitors at the 2010 Central American and Caribbean Games
Athletes (track and field) at the 2019 Pan American Games
Pan American Games competitors for Jamaica
Commonwealth Games gold medallists in athletics
Central American and Caribbean Games medalists in athletics
Athletes (track and field) at the 2020 Summer Olympics
World Athletics Indoor Championships medalists
20th-century Jamaican women
21st-century Jamaican women
Medallists at the 2014 Commonwealth Games
Medallists at the 2018 Commonwealth Games